"I'm Wondering" is a single released by American singer-songwriter Stevie Wonder as a non-album single in 1967. The single was released after his album, I Was Made to Love Her, had made its debut.

Background
Billboard described the single as "driving, pulsating material with a wailing performance that moves and grooves
all the way."  Cash Box said  that it's a "tremendous mid-speed blues rock side with "overwhelming vocals tied up with the powerful push of Detroit orking."

Personnel
 Lead vocals, harmony vocals, harmonica and possible keyboards by Stevie Wonder
 Backing vocals by The Andantes
 Other instrumentation by The Funk Brothers

Charts
"I'm Wondering" peaked at No. 12 on the Billboard Hot 100. It was a hit in the United Kingdom as well, where it made #22 on the Pop Charts.

References

1967 songs
1967 singles
Stevie Wonder songs
Motown singles